Marai Gumi or Kao Tien-lai (1951–2006) was a Taiwanese Atayal politician.

Marai Gumi was born on 23 August 1951. He attended National Sun Yat-sen University. Prior to  representing what became known as the Highland Aborigine Constituency in the Legislative Yuan from 1990 to 1996, he was mayor of Jianshi, Hsinchu.

References

1951 births
2006 deaths
Members of the 1st Legislative Yuan in Taiwan
Members of the 2nd Legislative Yuan
Aboriginal Members of the Legislative Yuan
Kuomintang Members of the Legislative Yuan in Taiwan
National Sun Yat-sen University alumni
Atayal people
Mayors of places in Taiwan
Politicians of the Republic of China on Taiwan from Hsinchu County